Andrew Gayle (born 19 September 1970) is an English former professional footballer. He played in The Football League for Oldham Athletic and Crewe Alexandra. He is currently assistant coach of Rossendale United.

Gayle was a trainee with Oldham Athletic and played once in the league for them during the 1988–89 season. He joined Crewe Alexandra, but again played just once. He had spell with Bury without playing in the league before dropping out of The Football League on joining Horwich RMI. He had a spell in Malta with Naxxar Lions before returning to Horwich. He subsequently played for Stalybridge Celtic, Accrington Stanley, Horwich (for a third time), Ashton United, Flixton, Witton Albion, Chorley and Oldham Town before joining Nantwich Town. He scored over 30 times in the 1999–2000 season and signed for Rossendale United in the 2000 close-season. However, he quit Rossendale in October 2000 to join St Helens Town as a protest at the sacking of Rossendale manager Micky Graham.

He stayed just a month with St Helens, joining Mossley in November 2000.

In March 2003 he signed for Winsford United and in July 2003 joined Abbey Hey.

He later became a coach with Rossendale United where he was reported to be also working as a taxicab driver.

References

1970 births
Living people
Footballers from Manchester
English footballers
Association football forwards
Oldham Athletic A.F.C. players
Crewe Alexandra F.C. players
Bury F.C. players
Leigh Genesis F.C. players
Naxxar Lions F.C. players
Stalybridge Celtic F.C. players
Accrington Stanley F.C. players
Ashton United F.C. players
Flixton F.C. players
Witton Albion F.C. players
Chorley F.C. players
Oldham Borough F.C. players
Nantwich Town F.C. players
Rossendale United F.C. players
St Helens Town A.F.C. players
Mossley A.F.C. players
Winsford United F.C. players
Abbey Hey F.C. players
English Football League players